Othello High School is a public high school in Othello, Washington, United States, and is part of the Othello School District. Its athletics name is the Huskies. The current principal is Alejandro Vergara.

References

External links
School District webpage
OSPI school report card 2012-13

Public high schools in Washington (state)
Adams County, Washington